William Omand (14 September 1931 – 2005) was Scottish amateur footballer who made over 250 appearances in the Scottish League for Queen's Park as an outside left. He later became president of the club. Omand represented Scotland at amateur level and played for touring team Middlesex Wanderers. As a player, he was described as "something of a reversion to the traditional Scottish inside forward, hunched over the ball and driving towards the opposition goal".

Personal life 
Omand attended Queen's Park Secondary School.

Honours 
Queen's Park
 Scottish Football League Division Two: 1955–56

References

Scottish footballers
Scottish Football League players
Association football outside forwards
Queen's Park F.C. players
1931 births
Association football wing halves
Footballers from Glasgow
Scotland amateur international footballers
2005 deaths
People educated at Queen's Park Secondary School